Steve Swallow (born October 4, 1940) is an American jazz bassist and composer, known for his collaborations with Jimmy Giuffre, Gary Burton, and Carla Bley. He was one of the first jazz double bassists to switch entirely to electric bass guitar.

Biography

Born in Fair Lawn, New Jersey, United States, Swallow studied piano and trumpet, as a child, before turning to the double bass at age 14. While attending a prep school, he began trying his hand in jazz improvisation. In 1960, he left Yale University, where he was studying composition, and settled in New York City, playing at the time in Jimmy Giuffre's trio along with Paul Bley. After joining Art Farmer's quartet in 1963, Swallow began to write. It is in the 1960s that his long-term association with Gary Burton's various bands began.

In the early 1970s, Swallow switched exclusively to electric bass guitar, of which he prefers the five-string variety. Along with Monk Montgomery and Bob Cranshaw, Swallow was among the first jazz bassists to do so (with much encouragement from Roy Haynes, one of Swallow's favorite drummers). He plays with a pick (made of copper by Hotlicks), and his style involves intricate solos in the upper register; he was one of the early adopters of the high C string on a bass guitar.

In 19741976, Swallow taught at the Berklee College of Music. He contributed several of his compositions to the Berklee students who assembled the first edition of The Real Book. He later recorded an album, Real Book, with the picture of a well-worn, coffee-stained book on the cover.

In 1978, Swallow became a member of Carla Bley's band. He has been Bley's romantic partner since the 1980s. He toured extensively with John Scofield in the early 1980s, and has returned to this collaboration several times over the years.

Swallow has consistently won the electric bass category in DownBeat yearly polls, both Critics' and Readers', since the mid-1980s. His compositions have been covered by, among others, Jim Hall (who recorded his very first tune, "Eiderdown"), Bill Evans, Chick Corea, Stan Getz and Gary Burton.

Partial discography

As leader/co-leader 
Hotel Hello with Gary Burton (ECM, 1974)
Homemusic to poems by Robert Creeley (ECM, 1980)
Night-Glo with Carla Bley (Watt, 1985)
Carla (Xtra Watt, 1987)
Duets with Carla Bley (Watt, 1988)
The Life of a Trio: Saturday with Paul Bley and Jimmy Giuffre (Owl, 1989)
The Life of a Trio: Sunday with Paul Bley and Jimmy Giuffre (Owl, 1989)
Swallow (Xtra Watt, 1991)
Go Together with Carla Bley (Watt, 1992)
Real Book (Xtra Watt, 1993)
Songs with Legs (Watt, 1994) with Carla Bley and Andy Sheppard
Parlance (Instant Present, 1995) with John Taylor
Deconstructed (Xtra Watt, 1996)
Are We There Yet? with Carla Bley (Watt, 1998)
Always Pack Your Uniform on Top (Xtra Watt/ECM, 2000)
Noisy Old Men (Jam, 2002) with Mick Goodrick, John Abercrombie, Gary Chaffee
Damaged in Transit with Chris Potter and Adam Nussbaum (Xtra Watt, 2003)
So There with Robert Creeley (Xtra Watt, 2006)
L'Histoire du Clochard with Ohad Talmor (Palmetto, 2007)
Carla's Christmas Carols with Carla Bley and the Partyka Brass Quintet (Watt, 2009)
Playing in Traffic with Ohad Talmor and Adam Nussbaum (Auand, 2009)
 Into the Woodwork (Xtra Watt, 2013) – recorded in 2011
 The New Standard with Jamie Saft and Bobby Previte (RareNoise, 2014)
 Loneliness Road with Jamie Saft, Bobby Previte and Iggy Pop (RareNoise, 2017)

As sideman 

With Rabih Abou-Khalil
 Blue Camel (Enja, 1992)
 The Sultan's Picnic (Enja, 1994)

With Carla Bley
 1978: Musique Mecanique (Watt, 1979)
 1979: Social Studies (Watt, 1980)
 1980: Live! (Watt, 1981) – live
 1981–83: I Hate to Sing (Watt, 1984) – live
 1983: Heavy Heart (Watt, 1984)
 1986–87: Sextet (Watt, 1987)
 1988: Fleur Carnivore (Watt, 1989) – live
 1990: The Very Big Carla Bley Band (Watt, 1991)
 1993: Big Band Theory (Watt, 1993)
 1996: The Carla Bley Big Band Goes to Church (Watt, 1996) – live
 1997: Fancy Chamber Music (Watt, 1998)
 1999: 4 x 4 (Watt, 2000)
 2002: Looking for America (Watt, 2003)
 2003: The Lost Chords (Watt, 2004) – live
 2006: Appearing Nightly (Watt, 2008) – live
 2007: The Lost Chords find Paolo Fresu (Watt, 2007)
 2013: Trios (ECM, 2013)
 2015: Andando el Tiempo (ECM, 2016)
 2019: Life Goes On (ECM, 2020)

With Paul Bley
 Footloose! (Savoy, 1963)
 Closer (ESP-Disk, 1966)
 Hot (Soul Note, 1985)

With Gary Burton
 The Groovy Sound of Music (RCA, 1963)
 The Time Machine (RCA, 1966)
 Tennessee Firebird (RCA, 1966)
 Duster (RCA, 1967)
 Lofty Fake Anagram (RCA, 1967)
 A Genuine Tong Funeral (RCA, 1967)
 Gary Burton Quartet in Concert (RCA, 1968)
 Country Roads & Other Places (RCA, 1969)
 Throb (Atlantic, 1969)
 Good Vibes (Atlantic, 1969)
 Paris Encounter (Atlantic, 1969) with Stéphane Grappelli
 Dreams So Real (ECM, 1975)
 Passengers (ECM, 1977)
 Times Square (ECM, 1978)
 Easy as Pie (ECM, 1980)
 Picture This (ECM, 1982)
 Whiz Kids (ECM, 1986)
 Real Life Hits (ECM, 1984)
 Quartet Live (Concord Jazz, 2009)

With Art Farmer
 Interaction (Atlantic, 1963)with Jim Hall
 Live at the Half-Note (Atlantic, 1963)with Jim Hall
 To Sweden with Love (Atlantic, 1964)with Jim Hall
 The Many Faces of Art Farmer (Scepter, 1964)
 Sing Me Softly of the Blues (Atlantic, 1965)

With Jimmy Giuffre
 1961 (ECM, 1992 – re-issue of the 1961 Verve-albums Fusion & Thesis)with Paul Bley
 Emphasis, Stuttgart 1961 (hatArt, 1992)
 Flight, Bremen 1961 (hatArt, 1993)
 Free Fall (Columbia, 1962)

With Steve Kuhn 
 Three Waves (Contact, 1966)
 Trance (ECM, 1974)
 Wisteria (ECM, 2012)
 At This Time (Sunnyside, 2016)

With Michael Mantler
 The Jazz Composer's Orchestra (JCOA, 1968)
 The Hapless Child (WATT, 1976)
 Movies (WATT, 1977)
 More Movies (WATT, 1980)
 Something There (WATT, 1982)

With Paul Motian
 Reincarnation of a Love Bird (JMT, 1995)
 Flight of the Blue Jay (Winter & Winter, 1995)
 Trio 2000 + One (Winter & Winter, 1997)
 Play Monk and Powell (Winter & Winter, 1998)

With George Russell
 Ezz-thetics (Riverside, 1961)
 The Stratus Seekers (Riverside, 1962)
 The Outer View (Riverside, 1962)

With John Scofield
 Bar Talk (Arista Novus, 1980)
 Shinola (Enja, 1982)
 Out Like a Light (Enja, 1983)
 Quiet (Verve, 1996)
 EnRoute: John Scofield Trio LIVE (Verve, 2004)
 Country for Old Men (Impulse!, 2016)
 Swallow Tales (ECM, 2020)

With others
 Dave Douglas, Riverside (Greenleaf, 2014) – recorded in 2014
 Don Ellis, Out of Nowhere (Candid, 1988) – recorded in 1961
 Pierre Favre, Window Steps (ECM, 1996) – recorded in 1995
 Stan Getz, The Stan Getz Quartet in Paris (Verve, 1967) – live recorded in 1966
 Chico Hamilton, El Exigente: The Demanding One (Flying Dutchman, 1970)
 Tore Johansen, I.S. (Inner Ear, 2010)
 Sheila Jordan, Portrait Of Sheila (Blue Note, 1963)
 Pete La Roca, Basra (Blue Note, 1965)
 Joe Lovano, Universal Language (Blue Note, 1992)
 Gary McFarland, Point of Departure (Impulse!, 1963)
 Pat Metheny and John Scofield, I Can See Your House from Here (Blue Note Records, 1994)
 Jimmy Raney, Jim Hall and Zoot Sims, Two Jims and Zoot (Mainstream, 1964)

References

External links
 Watt/XtraWatt  the recording company run by Swallow and Bley
 Steve Swallow and Carla Bley video interview about Dreams So Real and working with ECM Records

1940 births
20th-century American bass guitarists
20th-century American male musicians
Living people
Yale University alumni
Berklee College of Music faculty
People from Fair Lawn, New Jersey
American jazz bass guitarists
American male bass guitarists
ECM Records artists
American male jazz musicians
RareNoiseRecords artists